Zetzsche is a German surname. Notable people with the surname include:

Jost Oliver Zetzsche, German translator
Karl Eduard Zetzsche, German mathematician
Manfred Zetzsche, German actor
Mónica Zetzsche, Argentinian woman, former President of the YWCA

German-language surnames